is a district in eastern Kushiro Subprefecture, Hokkaidō, Japan.

Towns 
Akkeshi
Hamanaka

Districts in Hokkaido